Xanthoparmelia californica is a lichen which belongs to the Xanthoparmelia genus. The lichen is uncommon and is listed as imperiled by the Nature Conservatory.

Description 
Grows to around 3–6 cm in diameter with irregularly lobate lobes which are approximately 0.8-1.5 mm wide with smooth edges. The upper surface of the lichen is yellow-green to bluish green on the surface but becomes gains darker rings with age and light brown on the underside.

Habitat and range 
Found in the North American southwest including the US states of California, Utah, and Arizona and the Mexican state of Sonora.

See also 

 List of Xanthoparmelia species

References 

californica
Lichen species
Lichens of North America
Lichens described in 1934